Sompote Saengduenchai (24 May 1941 – 26 August  2021), internationally  known as Sompote Sands, was a Thai film director, special effects creator and producer best known for directing several Thai films especially tokusatsu (special effects-based) genre or monster films such as The 6 Ultra Brothers vs. the Monster Army, Jumborg Ace & Giant, the illegally produced Hanuman and the Five Riders, the 1980 cult classic Crocodile, Phra Rod Meree and the 1985 fantasy monster film Magic Lizard. He was the founder and owner of Chaiyo Productions based in Bang Pa-in, Phra Nakhon Si Ayutthaya.

Early life
Born as the youngest son in a Thai Chinese family in the outskirts Bangkok, Sompote's father was a Chinese immigrant from Guangdong. While he was studying at grade three, Sompote became a freelance photographer. His work was to take photos of King Bhumibol in a boy scout uniform. A photo was published on the cover of Chaiyaphruek, a youth magazine at that time. He was also a private photographer for Jim Thompson. At the age of 15, he was the youngest photographer for Siam Rath, a newspaper with M.R. Kukrit Pramoj as the owner and editor.

Tsuburaya co-productions and resulting controversies
In 1996, Sands presented Tsuburaya Productions with a document claiming that he had ownership of the international rights of Ultraman, the Ultra Series before 1974, and Jumborg Ace. These were all the properties licensed to Chaiyo Productions by Tsuburaya to direct the films The 6 Ultra Brothers vs. the Monster Army and Jumborg Ace & Giant. He claimed they were turned over to him twenty years earlier in 1976 by the patriarch of the Tsuburaya brand, Noboru Tsuburaya, who died the year before. While Chaiyo were licensed to create international material based on these licenses, they had also created original characters under the Ultraman name, starting a franchise called "Project Ultraman". Initially set to release films and television series under this name, they were ordered by Thailand courts to cease and desist anything they were doing outside of the original licenses in April 2007. On November 20, 2017, a Los Angeles Federal Court ruled that Sands, nor his companies Chaiyo and UM Corporation, did not have ownership of the brand after a jury found that the 1976 document was not authentic. The final judgement on April 18, 2018, forbids him and his companies to use the Ultra Franchise and all of its related characters, forcing him and the company to pay infringement damages.

Death
Sands died of cancer on 26 August 2021, at the age of 80.

Filmography
Films
Tah Tien (1973)
Jumborg Ace & Giant (Yuk Wud Jaeng Vs. Jumbo A) (1974)
The 6 Ultra Brothers vs. the Monster Army (Hanuman pob Jed Yodmanud) (1974) 
Hanuman and the Five Riders (Hanuman pob Har Aimoddaeng) (1974) (A controversial production that was made without the consent of the creators of the Kamen Rider series.)
Yod Manut Computer (1977)
Land of Grief (Pandin Wippayoke) (1978)
Ka Ki (1980)
Crocodile (Chorakhe) (1980)
Kraithong (1980)
Phra Rod Meree (1981)
Khun Chang Khun Phaen: Prab Chorakhe Tan Kwand (1982)
Phra Chao  Suea  Panthai-Norasing (1982)
Noble War (Suek Kumphakan) (1984)
Space Warriors 2000 (Hanuman pop Sib-et Yodmanud) (1984)
Kraithong II (1985)
Magic Lizard (King-ka kay-a-sit) (1985)
Television films/ Series
Kraithong (1972) Channel 7
Phra Aphai Mani (1973) Channel 3
Yai Ka Ta 
Long Prai
Project Ultraman (suspended broadcast due to court judgment)

References

External links
 

1941 births
2021 deaths
Deaths from cancer
Special effects people
Sompote Sands
Sompote Sands
Sompote Sands
Sompote Sands
Sompote Sands
Sompote Sands